Lee Chen-ch'ang (born 21 October 1986) is a Taiwanese professional baseball relief pitcher for the CTBC Brothers of the Chinese Professional Baseball League (CPBL). He previously played for the Cleveland Indians of Major League Baseball. He has also played for the Saitama Seibu Lions of Nippon Professional Baseball. Lee throws from a sidearm slot, and his fastball sits at 92–94 MPH and max out at 97 MPH.

Career

Cleveland Indians
Lee began playing baseball while a student at National Pingtung Senior High School. He competed for the Chinese Taipei national baseball team in the 2008 Summer Olympics, and had a 2.00 earned run average (ERA) and 11 strikeouts in two appearances. After appearing in the Olympics, the Cleveland Indians signed him as a free agent.

After joining the Indians organization, Lee competed in the 2009 World Baseball Classic. He began his stateside professional career with the Kinston Indians in 2009, finishing the year with a 4–6 win–loss record and a 3.35 ERA in 45 appearances. He spent 2010 with the Akron Aeros, and had a 4–5 record and a 3.22 ERA in 44 games. The following year, Lee split the season between the Aeros and Columbus Clippers. With the Clippers, he had a 4–0 record and a 2.21 ERA in 25 appearances.

After five games with the Clippers in 2012 and 19 in 2013, Lee was called up by the Cleveland Indians from their Triple-A affiliate Columbus Clippers on July 12, 2013, and became the tenth Taiwanese player to play in the MLB. In his debut on July 14, Lee pitched 1.1 innings in relief of Ubaldo Jiménez, allowing no hits and 1 walk. He was optioned back to Columbus on July 23 and finished the season there, ending it with a 2.37 ERA. Lee started the 2014 season in Columbus, but was brought up to the majors and had several stints with the Indians during the 2014 season.

Saitama Seibu Lions
On November 20, 2015, the Indians sold Lee's contract to the Saitama Seibu Lions of Nippon Professional Baseball.

On November 8, 2016, he became free agent.

Colorado Rockies
After the 2016 season, he signed a minor league contract with the Colorado Rockies, that includes an invitation to 2017 spring training.

Los Angeles Dodgers
He elected free agency on November 6, 2017 and signed a minor league contract with the Los Angeles Dodgers. On June 1, 2018, Lee exercised an opt-out clause in his contract in order to return to his home country of Taiwan and declare himself eligible for the 2018 Chinese Professional Baseball League (CPBL) draft.

Chinatrust / CTBC Brothers
Lee was selected first overall in the 2018 CPBL draft by the CTBC Brothers, and on July 10, 2018, signed to a 3.5 year deal with an annual salary of $248,000 USD plus $34,000 USD per season in incentives.

International career
He was selected for Chinese Taipei national baseball team at the 2006 Intercontinental Cup, 2006 Asian Games, 2008 Summer Olympics and 2009 World Baseball Classic.

See also
 List of Major League Baseball players from Taiwan

References

External links

1986 births
Living people
Akron Aeros players
Albuquerque Isotopes players
Asian Games gold medalists for Chinese Taipei
Asian Games medalists in baseball
Baseball players at the 2006 Asian Games
Baseball players at the 2008 Summer Olympics
CTBC Brothers players
Cleveland Indians players
Columbus Clippers players
Kinston Indians players
Lake County Captains players
Major League Baseball pitchers
Major League Baseball players from Taiwan
Medalists at the 2006 Asian Games
Nippon Professional Baseball pitchers
Oklahoma City Dodgers players
Olympic baseball players of Taiwan
People from Penghu County
Peoria Javelinas players
Saitama Seibu Lions players
Taiwanese expatriate baseball players in Japan
Taiwanese expatriate baseball players in the United States
2009 World Baseball Classic players
2023 World Baseball Classic players
Anchorage Bucs players